Brunch is a mid-morning meal, a combination of breakfast and lunch.

Brunch may also refer to:

 Brunch., the standard author abbreviation for Norwegian naturalist Jørgen Brunchorst (1862–1917)
 Brunch (album), a 1993 album by Wink
 Brunch, a 1999 EP by Self
 Brunch (musical), 2009 rock musical about the New York City restaurant scene
 Brunch (TV program), 2012 New Zealand morning television program
 "Brunch" (How I Met Your Mother), 2006 episode of the American sitcom How I Met Your Mother
 Brunch Bar, a brand of cereal bars made by Cadbury

See also